Jared Michael Rushton (born March 3, 1974) is an American former actor. He is best known for his roles in several films from the late 1980s, including Honey, I Shrunk the Kids, Big, and Overboard. He has been nominated for two Saturn Awards and two Young Artist Awards. He is also known for his roles in Pet Sematary Two and as Chip on the sitcom Roseanne. Rushton also starred in A Cry in the Wild.

Early life
Rushton was born in Provo, Utah. His first acting job was as a rocker in a "Barbie and the Rockers" commercial. His mother, Monica Rushton, assisted him on the set of Big. He also starred in the movie A Cry in the Wild, which was based on the book Hatchet by Gary Paulsen, and appeared briefly as a reluctant father-to-be on the CBS drama Northern Exposure.

Career 
Rushton began his career at age twelve as Richie in an episode of Tales from the Darkside. He also appeared in another show, Cagney & Lacey, and a television film, Top Kids. In 1987, he played his first major role, as Kurt Russell's character's son in the film Overboard. The next year he starred in Lady in White as Donald and as Tom Hanks's friend Billy in Big. Rushton, who is a natural blond, dyed his hair red for the film.

After the success of Big, Rushton appeared on an episode of Murder, She Wrote as Travis Harmon. He later appeared as Chip Lang, Becky's boyfriend on the television sitcom Roseanne for three episodes. After this, Rushton was cast as Ron Thompson in Honey, I Shrunk the Kids.

After finishing Honey, I Shrunk the Kids, Rushton appeared on an episode of Midnight Caller and filmed A Cry in the Wild as Brian Robeson, a film based on the book Hatchet. In 1992, Rushton guest-starred in an episode of Haunted Lives: True Ghost Stories. He also had a starring role in Pet Sematary Two, as the school bully, Clyde Parker, a main enemy of Edward Furlong`s character. He also guest-starred in the Dr. Quinn, Medicine Woman episode entitled "Bad Water".

Filmography

Television 
 Cover Me: Based on the True Life of an FBI Family - Seth Kesseling (1 episode, 2000) 
  Cover Me - USA (short title)
 The Line (2000) TV episode - Seth Kesseling
 Cracker: Mind Over Murder - Bill Lane (1 episode, 1999) 
 a.k.a. Cracker - USA (original title) 
 a.k.a. Cracker: The Complete Series - International (English title) (DVD box title)
 Best Boys (1999) TV episode - Bill Lane
 Dead Man's Walk (miniseries) - Wesley Buttons (2 episodes, 1996) 
 Episode #1.3 (1996) TV episode - Wesley Buttons
 Episode #1.1 (1996) TV episode - Wesley Buttons
 ER - Andy Bohlmeyer (1 episode, 1994) 
 ER Confidential (1994) TV episode - Andy Bohlmeyer
 The Yarn Princess (1994) (TV) - Peter Thomas
 Northern Exposure (1993)
 Heal Thyself - TV episode - Phil
 CBS Schoolbreak Special - Alex Raymond (1 episode, 1993) 
 Other Mothers (1993) TV episode - Alex Raymond
 Dr. Quinn, Medicine Woman - Calvin Harding (1 episode, 1993) 
 Bad Water (1993) TV episode - Calvin Harding
 Life Goes On - Ziggy (1 episode, 1992) 
 Babes in the Woods (1992) TV episode - Ziggy
 Camp Wilder (1 episode, 1992) 
 The First Kiss (1992) TV episode - David
 Where's Rodney? (1990) (TV) - Rodney Barnes
 Midnight Caller - Sylver Jensen (1 episode, 1990) 
 Planes (1990) TV episode - Sylver Jensen
 Roseanne - Chip Lang (3 episodes, 1988-1989) 
 Becky's Choice (1989) TV episode - Chip Lang
 Dan's Birthday Bash (1989) TV episode - Chip Lang
 Lovers' Lane (1988) TV episode - Chip Lang
 Murder, She Wrote - Travis Harmon (1 episode, 1988) 
 Coal Miner's Slaughter (1988) TV episode - Travis Harmon
 Top Kids (1987) (TV)
 Cagney & Lacey - Peter Wade (1 episode, 1986) 
 The Marathon (1986) TV episode - Peter Wade
 Tales from the Darkside - Richie (1 episode, 1986) 
 A Serpent's Tooth (1986) TV episode - Richie

Movies 
 Pet Sematary Two (1992) - Clyde Parker
 A Cry in the Wild (1990) - Brian Robeson
 Honey, I Shrunk the Kids (1989) - Ronald 'Ron' Thompson 
 a.k.a. Microkids! - Japan (English title)
 Big (1988) - Billy Kopecki
 Lady in White (1988) - Donald
 Overboard (1987) - Charlie Proffitt

Self - video 
 Big: Chemistry of a Classic (2007) (V) - Himself

Self - TV 
 Prop Culture (2020) Himself, Episode: "Honey, I Shrunk the Kids"
 Haunted Lives: True Ghost Stories (1991) (TV)

External links

1974 births
20th-century American male actors
American male child actors
American male film actors
Living people
Musicians from Provo, Utah